Guan won numerous major international doubles titles in the late 1980s and early 1990s. She is the only woman to have won three consecutive women's doubles titles at the BWF World Championships. She won the 1987 and 1989 tournaments with Lin Ying, and the 1991 tourney with Nong Qunhua. Guan competed in badminton at the 1992 Summer Olympics in women's doubles, and earned the silver medal together with Nong Qunhua. She was a member of Chinese Uber Cup (women's international) teams that won 4 Time Consecutive In 1986, 1988, 1990 and 1992.

References

External links
profile

1964 births
Living people
Badminton players from Guangzhou
Badminton players at the 1992 Summer Olympics
Olympic badminton players of China
Olympic silver medalists for China
Olympic medalists in badminton
Asian Games medalists in badminton
Badminton players at the 1986 Asian Games
Chinese female badminton players
Badminton players at the 1990 Asian Games
Badminton players at the 1988 Summer Olympics
Medalists at the 1992 Summer Olympics
Asian Games gold medalists for China
Medalists at the 1986 Asian Games
Medalists at the 1990 Asian Games